{{speciesbox
| image = Naturalis Biodiversity Center - RMNH.AVES.37520 1 - Phyllastrephus fischeri placidus (Shelley, 1889) - Pycnonotidae - bird skin specimen.jpeg
| status = LC
| status_system = IUCN3.1
| status_ref = 
| genus = Phyllastrephus
| species = fischeri
| authority = (Reichenow, 1879)
| range_map = Phyllastrephus fischeri distribution map.png
| synonyms = * Criniger Fischeri
 Phyllastrephus alfredi itoculo}}

Fischer's greenbul (Phyllastrephus fischeri) is a species of songbird in the bulbul family, Pycnonotidae.
It is found in eastern Africa from southern Somalia to north-eastern Mozambique.
Its natural habitats are subtropical or tropical dry forests, subtropical or tropical moist lowland forests, and subtropical or tropical moist shrubland.

Taxonomy and systematics 
Fischer's greenbul was originally described in the genus Criniger''. Formerly, some authorities have considered it as a subspecies of Sharpe's greenbul and some have also considered Cabanis's greenbul and the placid greenbul to be subspecies of Fischer's greenbul.
The common name and scientific name commemorate the German explorer Gustav Fischer. Alternate names for Fischer's greenbul include the East Coast olive greenbul and Fischer's bulbul.

References

Phyllastrephus
Greenbuls
Birds of East Africa
Birds described in 1879
Taxonomy articles created by Polbot